The Rockman Zero series, known as the Mega Man Zero series outside Japan, is a series of four video games for the Game Boy Advance set in Capcom's Mega Man video game franchise. The music of the series consists of the soundtracks to the four games, as well as the released albums associated with them. The music to Mega Man Zero, the first game, was composed by Ippo Yamada with one track by Setsuo Yamamoto; the music of Mega Man Zero 2 was composed by Yamada, Masaki Suzuki, Luna Umegaki, Chicken Mob, and Tsutomu Kurihara; the soundtrack of Mega Man Zero 3 was composed by Yamada, Suzuki, Kurihara, and Umegaki; and Mega Man Zero 4s music was composed by Yamada, Suzuki, Umegaki, and Shinichi Itakura.

The soundtracks for the first three games were released together as the Rockman Zero 1~3 Game Music Collection in 2004. Albums of remixed music have been released for each game, all in 2004, with Remastered Tracks Rockman Zero for the first, Remastered Tracks Rockman Zero Idea for the second, Remastered Tracks Rockman Zero Telos for the third, and Remastered Tracks Rockman Zero Physis for Rockman 4. A fifth album, Remastered Tracks Rockman Zero Mythos was released in 2010 to correspond with the release of the Mega Man Zero Collection compilation for the Nintendo DS. Remastered Tracks Rockman Zero, Telos, and Physis include in addition to their musical tracks several radio drama tracks, in which voice actors play in a drama whose story is related to the associated game.

Albums

Rockman Zero Game Music Complete Works -Rockman Zero 1~3-

Rockman Zero Game Music Complete Works - Rockman Zero 1~3- is a soundtrack album which contains music from Mega Man Zero, Mega Man Zero 2, and Mega Man Zero 3. The tracks were composed by Ippo Yamada, Luna Umegaki, Chicken Mob, Masaki Suzuki, Tsutomu Kurihara, and Makoto Tomozawa, though "Theme of ZERO", taken from the soundtrack of Mega Man X, was composed by Setsuo Yamamoto. The album was published by Suleputer on July 1, 2004 with the catalog numbers CPCA-1092/3 . The two-disc album contains 103 tracks and covers a duration of 2:25:03. The album presents the tracks separated by game, with the Zero 2 tracks split by the disc boundary.

Track list

Remastered Tracks Rockman Zero

Remastered Tracks Rockman Zero is a soundtrack album which contains almost all remixed game tracks from Mega Man Zero, plus some drama tracks which explain events that occurred during the game. The majority of the tracks were composed by Ippo Yamada, though "Theme of ZERO", taken from the soundtrack of Mega Man X, was composed by Setsuo Yamamoto.  The album was published by Inti Creates on January 23, 2004 with the catalog number INTIR-001. The album was released six months before the Rockman Zero 1~3 album, making it the first release of music from the game. It contains 26 tracks, of which 5 are drama tracks rather than songs, and covers a duration of 56:52. The drama tracks are marked in their official titles with a "*".

 Literal translation of the original titles appear in (brackets) if different

Remastered Tracks Rockman Zero: Idea

Remastered Tracks Rockman Zero: Idea is a soundtrack album which contains remixed game tracks from Mega Man Zero 2, plus some remixes of extra tracks not included in the game. The tracks were composed and remixed by Ippo Yamada, Luna Umegaki, Masaki Suzuki, Chicken Mob, and Tsutomu Kurihara. The two-disc album was published by Inti Creates on May 28, 2004 with the catalog numbers INTIR-002/3. It contains 40 tracks and covers a duration of 1:52:22.

Track list

 Literal translation of the original titles appear in (brackets) if different

Remastered Tracks Rockman Zero: Telos

Remastered Tracks Rockman Zero: Telos is a soundtrack album which contains remixed game tracks from Mega Man Zero 3. The tracks were composed and remixed by Ippo Yamada, Luna Umegaki, Masaki Suzuki, Makoto Tomozawa, and Tsutomu Kurihara. The two-disc album was published by Inti Creates on December 12, 2004 with the catalog numbers INTIR-004/5. It contains 47 tracks and covers a duration of 2:10:54. The last ten tracks of the second disc are drama tracks, which cover multiple events set both before Mega Man Zero 3 and during.

Track list

 Literal translation of the original titles appear in (brackets) if different

Remastered Tracks Rockman Zero: Physis

Remastered Tracks Rockman Zero: Physis is a soundtrack album which contains remixed game tracks from Mega Man Zero 4. The tracks were composed and remixed by Ippo Yamada, Luna Umegaki, Masaki Suzuki, Shinichi Itakura, and Chicken Mob. The two-disc album was published by Inti Creates on September 30, 2005 with the catalog numbers INTIR-006/7. It contains 41 tracks and covers a duration of 2:03:20. Several of the tracks are drama tracks rather than tunes; these focus on the events of the game rather than expanding on them as in previous albums. The last three tracks are karaoke versions of tracks from previous albums. The title of the drama tracks begin with "Ragnarok Record".

Track list

 Literal translation of the original titles appear in (brackets) if different

Remastered Tracks Rockman Zero: Mythos

Remastered Tracks Rockman Zero: Mythos is a soundtrack album which contains remixed game tracks from Mega Man Zero Collection, a compilation release of the Mega Man Zero games for the Nintendo DS. The tracks were composed and remixed by Ippo Yamada, Luna Umegaki, and Tsutomu Kurihara. The album was published by Inti Creates on June 10, 2010 with the catalog number INTIR-0018. It contains 14 tracks, including one hidden track, and covers a duration of 48:18. Unlike the previous albums, Mythos does not include any drama tracks. At the same time that Mythos was released, a box set entitled Remastered Tracks Rockman Zero Limited Box was published, containing all five Remastered Tracks albums.

References

Mega Man Zero
Mega Man Zero series